Three Crosses can refer to:

 Three Crosses, a monument in Vilnius, Lithuania
 Three Crosses Square, an urban square in Warsaw, Poland
 Three Crosses, Swansea (Welsh: Y Crwys), a village in Wales, United Kingdom
 Three Crosses (band), an American Christian rock  band from New Jersey